Singapore Pro Wrestling, commonly shortened to SPW, is a professional wrestling promotion based in Singapore. It was the first modern professional wrestling promotion in Southeast Asia, and was founded by Andruew Tang (known as "The Statement" Andruew Tang in SPW), the first Singaporean professional wrestler, and Vadim Koryagin, in February 2012. The promotion also has a wrestling school, in which Andruew Tang is the head coach, and SPW wrestlers, Aiden Rex, Dr. Gore, Alexis Lee and Da Butcherman work as assistant coaches. SPW is best known for producing Dante Chen (known as "Trexxus/Kaiser Trexxus" during his time in SPW), the first wrestler from Southeast Asia to sign with WWE, making his debut on WWE NXT, on 22 September 2021.

History

Early years (2011-2014) 
In 2011, Andruew Tang, an aspiring Singaporean professional wrestler, would attend a talk by Vadim Koryagin, a Russian businessman and owner of Independent Wrestling Federation (IWF), a Russia-based promotion, established in 2002. Together the two would form the nation's first pro wrestling promotion, Singapore Pro Wrestling in February 2012. They would begin to train the first generation of Singaporean professional wrestlers, including Tang, who would become "The Statement" Andruew Tang, Singapore's first professional wrestler and Kaiser Trexxus, who would become the first Singaporean in the WWE, through Vadim's coaching and expertise.  SPW faced difficulties in the beginning, with many people doubting the promotion, and believing that Singaporeans "were too small". In the beginning some of their wrestlers would appear in IWF shows, but later on they would host live shows in Singapore, beginning to gain an audience. SPW would develop more regular talent, including Dr. Gore and The Eurasian Dragon, and eventually Tang and Trexxus would become trainers, after honing their talents. In 2014, SPW would grow to a size that they were able to host international talent including Johnny Gargano and Sonjay Dutt.

Growth and expansion (2015–2019) 
A major turning point for SPW, was when they hosted a show a day before the 2015 WWE Live Event at the Singapore Indoor Stadium, which sold out completely. SPW would inaugurate their first title, the Southeast Asian Championship in 2015, with their first champion being "The Statement" Andruew Tang. SPW would host foreign talent, including IWF wrestler, Lokomotiv and DDT wrestler, Masa Takanashi, who would help the promotion grow, each winning the Southeast Asian championship. In the next year SPW would add three more titles to the promotion, the Queen of Asia, Tag Team and Singapore championships. In 2017, Rene Dupree would debut in SPW, facing Tang. Later that year, NXT UK Champion, at that time, Pete Dunne would debut in the company and face Tang in a singles match. SPW would continue to grow, developing local talent such as Alexis Lee (who would be called for a WWE tryout along with The Statement and Kaiser Trexxus), bodybuilder and the 2016 Mr. Singapore, Danie "Destroyer" Dharma, Da Butcherman, Big T, BGJ and Aiden Rex, who would all win various championships in the SPW promotion. In 2018, SPW would host its first all female event, titled Ladies Night. The main event of this show would feature Riho facing Makoto, which would become SPWs most viewed match ever. In 2019, globally-known AEW wrestler, Kenny Omega, would also debut in the promotion, participating in a 3 on 3 tag match. Tajiri would make his SPW debut in 2019, defeating Tang. SPW would grow to have over 10,000 subscribers on YouTube, and over 10,000 followers on Instagram and Facebook combined.

Covid-19 and return (2020–present) 
SPW hosted its last show of 2020, No Guts No Glory, in February, featuring then NXT UK Women's Champion, Meiko Satomura and Dash Chisako in the main event. During the COVID-19 pandemic, SPW produced two seasons of an in-house show, called SPW Prove: Alive and Kicking and SPW Prove: It's A Slamdemic. During the first season of Prove, The Statement would retire Kaiser Trexxus from the promotion, who would leave to WWE NXT and debut as Dante Chen. Their second season was cut short as restrictions were lifted and SPW returned to a live show format, with their first private live show back on 15 April 2022, SPW: Sembawang Showdown, a private event for migrant workers of Singapore. SPW hosted their first public live show, SPW: Homecoming on 27 May 2022, that sold out in a few days. In July, SPW had their second public event of the year, SPW: Battlefront. In September, SPW would announce its partnership with Nothing But Cheese Burger to introduce the promotions 5th title, The NBCB Championship, a 24/7 championship. In November 2022, SPW hosted its 10th anniversary show, featuring the return of Riho, Tajiri, Masa Takanashi, HoHo Lun and the debut of Chris Brookes and Mei Suruga, SPW X: Astronomical Anniversary.

Roster

Notable alumni/guests 

 Anton Deryabin
 Baliyan Akki
 Ben-K
 Chris Brookes
 Cima
 Craven
 Dante Chen
 Dash Chisako
 El Lindaman
 Emman Azman
 Emi Sakura
 Hiroyo Matsumoto
 Ho Ho Lun
 Indi Hartwell
 Issei Onitsuka
 Jake de Leon
 Jason Lee
 Jibzy
 Joaquin Wilde
 Johnny Gargano
 Kasey
 Kenny Omega
 Lokomotiv
 Makoto
 Mark Davis
 Masa Takanashi
 Matt Cross
 Meiko Satomura
 Mei Suruga
 Michael Nakazawa
 Nor "Phoenix" Diana
 Pete Dunne
 Reika Saiki
 Rene Dupree
 Riho
 Shaukat
 Sonjay Dutt
 Susumu Yokosuka
 Tajiri
 Yuki Kamifuku
 T-Hawk
 Shaukat
 Wolfgang

Progression of champions

SPW Southeast Asian Championship

The SPW Southeast Asian Championship is the regional championship, and the primary and most prestigious title of the Singapore Pro Wrestling promotion. There have been a total of 9 reigns shared between 6 different champions. The current champion is Aiden Rex, who won the title at SPW Homecoming in May 2022. The Statement Andruew Tang was the inaugural champion, also holding the belt for the most times, being 4, and having the record for the longest reign at 826 days.

SPW Singapore Championship

The SPW Singapore Championship is the national championship and the secondary title of the Singapore Pro Wrestling promotion. There have been a total of six reigns. The current champion is Black Arrow. The inaugural champion was the Eurasian Dragon who won the belt in 2016.

SPW Queen of Asia Championship

The SPW Queen of Asia Championship is the women's title of the Singapore Pro Wrestling promotion.  The current champion is Alexis Lee.

SPW Southeast Asian Tag Team Championships

The SPW Southeast Asian Tag Team Championship are the tag team titles of the Singapore Pro Wrestling promotion. The title is currently held by Masa Takanashi and Chris Brookes, the Calamari Drunken Kings.

SPW NBCB Championship 

The SPW Nothing But Cheese Burger Championship, commonly shortened to the NBCB Championship, is the 24/7 title of the Singapore Pro Wrestling promotion, meaning it must be defended at all times, and opponents can demand a match on their own accord. Destroyer Dharma is the current NBCB Champion.

See also 

 List of professional wrestling promotions
 List of Singaporean male professional wrestlers
 List of Singaporean female professional wrestlers

References

External links
 
 

Professional wrestling promotions
Entertainment companies established in 2012
Companies of Singapore
Entertainment in Singapore
2012 establishments in Singapore
Professional wrestling in Singapore